Jiří Veselý (born 10 July 1993) is a Czech professional tennis player.
He reached a career-high singles ranking of World No. 35 on 27 April 2015.

Juniors
In 2011, Veselý won the boys' singles title at the Australian Open, defeating Australian Luke Saville in straight sets. He also won the boys' doubles titles at the Australian Open, partnering Filip Horanský of Slovakia; they defeated Ben Wagland and Andrew Whittington of Australia in the final. The same year he reached the finals of the US Open singles and the Wimbledon doubles (as well the final of the US Open doubles in 2010).

Veselý reached the No. 1 junior combined world ranking in January 2011, compiling a singles win–loss record of 125–45.

Professional career

2012–2015: Grand Slam debut, first singles and doubles titles, Top 35 debut and career-high ranking 
Veselý made his Davis Cup debut for Czech Republic in February 2013, and to date has nine singles titles on the ITF Futures circuit to his name and three Challengers.

Veselý qualified into the 2013 French Open for his first appearance into the main draw of a Grand Slam. Vesely was, at the time, the youngest player in the world's top 100 at 20 years and 3 months old. In 2014, Veselý reached the 3rd round of the 2013 BNP Paribas Open where he lost to Andy Murray in three sets.

Veselý won his first Grand Slam match at the 2014 French Open, then the following month reached the third round of a Major for the first time in his career at the 2014 Wimbledon Championships as a wildcard. He beat Gaël Monfils in five sets in the second round, before being defeated by fellow wildcard Nick Kyrgios in four sets. He also won his first ATP doubles title at the 2014 Kremlin Cup with countryman František Čermák.

Veselý reached two singles finals at ATP World Tour, winning his first title at the 2015 Heineken Open in Auckland, after defeating Adrian Mannarino. 

He reached the third round of a Major for the second time in his career at the 2015 Us Open and first at this Major, with a victory over Ivo Karlović.

2016: Two ATP top 10 wins, including over the World No. 1 Djokovic, Wimbledon fourth round
Veselý represented the Czech Republic at the 2016 Hopman Cup alongside Karolína Plíšková. He recorded a singles win over Lleyton Hewitt of Australia, however was defeated by Alexandr Dolgopolov of Ukraine and Jack Sock of the United States.

At the Monte Carlo, he beat world No. 1 Novak Djokovic in a stunning second-round upset. It was the first time Djokovic had lost at a Masters tournament prior to the final since the 2014 Shanghai Masters, and his earliest exit from any tournament in three years. However, he lost to Gaël Monfils in straights sets in the third round. Veselý made it to the third round of the 2016 Istanbul Open – Singles before losing to Grigor Dimitrov. At the Nice Open, he lost to Leonardo Mayer in the first round. Veselý made it to the second round of the 2016 French Open by beating Rajeev Ram in the first round. He lost to Nicolás Almagro.

Veselý started his grass court season at 2016 Aegon Championships by losing to Kevin Anderson in qualifying, but earned the lucky loser spot. He beat Jérémy Chardy in the first round before falling to Milos Raonic in the second round. He next competed at the 2016 Nottingham Open. He beat Horacio Zeballos, but lost to 8th seeded Gilles Müller in the second. 

At the 2016 Wimbledon Championships, Jiří pushed through 3 consecutive tie-broken sets, besting world No. 8 Dominic Thiem, to move through to the third round. It was his second top 10 win of his career after beating Novak Djokovic earlier in the season. He defeated the 31st seed João Sousa in the third round. Jiří lost to fellow countryman Tomáš Berdych in a hard-fought five set match.

Veselý next competed at the 2016 Davis Cup representing his country. He lost both of his matches to the French.

Jiří was seeded 8th at the 2016 Croatia Open. In the first round, he won in straight sets, but was forced to retire in the second round against Carlos Berlocq due to injury. He next competed at the 2016 Western & Southern Open where he lost in the first round to Marcel Granollers. The 2016 Winston-Salem Open proved dreadful for him as he was forced to retire again during his match in the third round to Andrey Kuznetsov. He was able to Compete at the 2016 US Open. He beat Saketh Myneni in the first round and set up a rematch of Monte Carlo with world number one Novak Djokovic. However, Veselý pulled out before the match was set to begin because of a left arm injury.

His first tournament since the US Open was the 2016 Shenzhen Open, where he was seeded 8th. He won his first two matches in straight sets, but lost to his idol and countryman Tomáš Berdych in three sets. He finished his season by competing at the 2016 Japan Open. Jiří won his first round match against Kevin Anderson in three sets before losing to David Goffin in the second round.

2017–2020: Second doubles title, second singles title & first since 2015
Veselý won his second doubles title partnering Roman Jebavy at the 2017 Istanbul Open.

Veselý started off 2020 by playing on the ATP Challenger tour, advancing to the quarterfinals in 2020 Bangkok Challenger II, before losing to eventual champion Federico Gaio in straight sets. He then entered the main draw in 2020 Maharashtra Open. He opened his campaign by defeating wildcard Arjun Kadhe, then beat 7th seed Salvatore Caruso in straight sets, before saving a match point in the final tiebreak to defeat Ilya Ivashka in 3 tight sets. In the semifinals, he once again required 3 sets, saving 4 match points to defeat Ričardas Berankis, to advance to his first tour-level final since April 2015. He defeated Egor Gerasimov in 3 sets to win the title.

2022: Second victory over Djokovic, first ATP 500 final
Veselý started his 2022 season at the Adelaide International 1. He lost in the first round to sixth seed Tommy Paul. Getting past qualifying at the Sydney Classic, he was defeated in the first round by Brandon Nakashima. At the Australian Open, he was eliminated from the tournament in the first round by American wildcard Stefan Kozlov.

Seeded fourth and defending champion from when the Maharashtra Open was last held in 2020, Veselý failed to defend his title; he lost in the quarterfinals to sixth seed and eventual finalist, Emil Ruusuvuori. As a result, his ranking fell from 80 to 123; he exited the top 100 for the first time since the beginning of 2020. As the top seed at the Bengaluru Open, he retired after losing the first set to opponent, sixth seed Enzo Couacaud, due to fatigue caused by a bout of food poisoning. In Doha, he lost in the first round to Arthur Rinderknech. Veselý, ranked World No. 123 at the time, qualified for the Dubai Championships by defeating Hady Habib and Alexei Popyrin. He then reached the quarterfinals with victories over world No. 24 Marin Čilić and eighth seed and world No. 15, Roberto Bautista Agut. In the quarterfinals, he recorded his second career victory over Novak Djokovic, defeating the World No. 1 in straight sets to reach the semifinal, his first since 2020 in Pune. This victory also allowed Daniil Medvedev to ascend to the World No. 1 ranking, marking the first time a male player outside the Big Four held the number 1 ranking since Andy Roddick in 2004. He then defeated sixth seed and world No. 14, Denis Shapovalov, in three sets to reach his first ATP 500 final claiming his third top-20 win in the tournament. He lost the final in straight sets to second seed and world No. 7, Andrey Rublev. After the tournament, his ranking improved from 123 to 74.

In March, Veselý competed at the Challenger di Roseto degli Abruzzi II. As the top seed, he lost in the first round to Nino Serdarušić. Seeded fourth at the Andalucía Challenger, he reached the semifinals where he was defeated by Jaume Munar. At the Grand Prix Hassan II in Marrakesh, he retired in the third set during his first-round match against Malek Jaziri. In Estoril, he lost in the first round to qualifier Hugo Dellien. At the Mutua Madrid Open, he fell in the first round of qualifying to David Goffin. At Roland Garros, he was beaten in the first round by Steve Johnson.

Veselý started his grass-court season at the Nottingham Open. Seeded second, he lost in the first round to British tennis player, Ryan Peniston. Seeded second at the Ilkley Trophy, he made it to the quarterfinals where he was defeated by fifth seed and eventual finalist, Jack Sock. At Wimbledon, he reached the third round where he lost to 30th seed and world No. 32, Tommy Paul.

After Wimbledon, Veselý played at the Hall of Fame Open. Seeded seventh, he withdrew from his second-round match against Steve Johnson.

In August, Veselý competed at the Odlum Brown Vancouver Open. Seeded second, he lost in the second round to Gilles Simon. Seeded second at the Championnats Banque Nationale de Granby, he was defeated in the first round by American qualifier Aidan Mayo. At the US Open, he lost in the first round to 20th seed and world No. 23, Dan Evans.

Coaching
Veselý's current coaches are Jaroslav Navrátil and Dusan Lojda. In December 2015 Veselý began to work with Tomáš Krupa, formerly the longtime coach of Tomáš Berdych.

Performance timelines

Singles
Current through the 2022 Dubai.

Doubles
Current through the 2022 Qatar ExxonMobil Open.

ATP career finals

Singles: 4 (2 titles, 2 runner-ups)

Doubles: 3 (2 titles, 1 runner-up)

Challenger and Futures finals

Singles: 22 (17 titles, 5 runner–ups)

Doubles: 10 (6 titles, 4 runner–ups)

Best Grand Slam results details

Record against other players

Record against top 10 players
Veselý's match record against those who have been ranked in the top 10, with those who have been No. 1 in boldface

 Ernests Gulbis 4–0
 Kevin Anderson 3–2
 Novak Djokovic 2–0
 Diego Schwartzman 2–0
 Fernando Verdasco 2–0
 Fabio Fognini 2–3
 Nikolay Davydenko 1–0
 Tommy Haas 1–0
 Casper Ruud 1–0
 Jürgen Melzer 1–0
 Denis Shapovalov 1–0
 Mikhail Youzhny 1–0
 Alexander Zverev 1–0
 Gaël Monfils 1–2
 Gilles Simon 1–2
 Dominic Thiem 1–2
 Jack Sock 1–3
 Pablo Carreño Busta 0–1
 Marin Čilić 1–1
 Felix Auger-Aliassime 0–1
 David Goffin 0–1
 Juan Mónaco 0–1
 Andy Murray 0–1
 Kei Nishikori 0–1
 Jo-Wilfried Tsonga 0–1
 Nicolás Almagro 0–2
 Grigor Dimitrov 0–2
 Richard Gasquet 0–2
 John Isner 0–2
 Karen Khachanov 0–2
 Rafael Nadal 0–2
 Lucas Pouille 0–2
 Milos Raonic 0–2
 Stan Wawrinka 0–2
 Marcos Baghdatis 0–4
 Roberto Bautista Agut 1–4
 Tomáš Berdych 0–4

*

Wins over top 10 players

Notes

References

External links
 
 

1993 births
Living people
Australian Open (tennis) junior champions
Czech male tennis players
Sportspeople from Příbram
Tennis players at the 2010 Summer Youth Olympics
Hopman Cup competitors
Grand Slam (tennis) champions in boys' singles
Grand Slam (tennis) champions in boys' doubles
Youth Olympic gold medalists for the Czech Republic